Cindy Brown (born 31 May 1985) is a South African field hockey player who competed in the 2008 Summer Olympics.

References

External links

1985 births
Living people
Alumni of St Mary's School, Waverley
South African female field hockey players
Olympic field hockey players of South Africa
Field hockey players at the 2008 Summer Olympics